The UMass Minutemen football team represents the University of Massachusetts in the NCAA Division I Football Bowl Subdivision (FBS). Massachusetts is the fourth oldest program in FBS. The Minutemen compete as an FBS independent. Since 1965, their home games have been played at Warren McGuirk Alumni Stadium on the university's campus in Hadley, Massachusetts.

UMass began play in 1879 and have since appeared in three FCS National Championship games, winning the title in 1998. The Minutemen began a two-year Football Bowl Subdivision transition period in 2011, becoming bowl eligible in 2013. In March 2014, the Mid-American Conference and UMass announced an agreement for the Minutemen to leave the conference after the 2015 season due to UMass declining an offer to become a full member of the conference.

The Minutemen have subsequently played as an independent through the 2019 season. , the program's 12-game schedules through the 2022 season are fixed, 10 of 12 games are fixed for both 2023 and 2024, and at least three games per season are fixed out to 2028.

UMass named Don Brown as their next head football coach on November 22, 2021. This will be his second stint as head coach for the Minutemen.

History

Early history (1879–1977)

UMass began playing football on November 22, 1879, when the school was known as Massachusetts Agricultural College, and the team was known as the "Aggies." They were first organized the previous fall by Francis Codman, but did not play their first game until November 22, 1879, defeating the Amherst College freshman team 4–0. As this was their only game that year, 1879 is noted as their first undefeated season, matched only by the 1889 season (2–0) and the 1963 season (8–0–1). Massachusetts later teamed up with Storrs Agricultural College (now the University of Connecticut) and Rhode Island College of Agriculture and Mechanic Arts (now the University of Rhode Island) to form the Athletic League of New England State Colleges for the purpose of scheduling football matchups between the schools. The first meeting between the Aggies and each of the other schools resulted in a shutout win for Massachusetts, as they defeated Connecticut, 36–0, in 1897 and Rhode Island, 46–0, in 1903. Massachusetts won their 100th game on October 2, 1920, topping rival Connecticut in a 28–0 shutout. The team played their 1000th game on November 11, 2000, losing to conference foe Delaware, 19–31. The team's nickname has endured several changes throughout the years. Though the official nickname remained "Aggies", "Statesmen" was also used interchangeably beginning when the school was renamed to Massachusetts State College in 1931. The nickname was officially changed to the "Redmen" when the name of the college became the University of Massachusetts in 1947.

Pittsburgh assistant coach Vic Fusia took over the Redmen football program in 1961 and under his tutelage, UMass compiled a record of 59–32–2. The Fusia era included an undefeated 8–0–1 campaign in 1963 as well as records of 8–2, 7–2, 6–3 and 7–2 in the following years. However, two losing records in three seasons led to Fusia's dismissal after the 1970 season. Denver Broncos linebackers and defensive backs coach Dick MacPherson, a former UMass assistant from 1959–1960, took over after Fusia's firing. Under MacPherson, the Redmen compiled a record of 45–27–1. In response to changing attitudes regarding the use of Native American-themed mascots, they changed their mascot in 1972 to the Minuteman, based on the historical "minuteman" relationship with Massachusetts; women's teams and athletes are known as Minutewomen.

Bob Pickett era (1978–1983)
Bob Pickett was promoted from defensive coordinator to head coach of the Minutemen football program in 1978. Under Pickett's tutelage, the Minutemen won four conference championships and compiled a record of 36–28. Despite the successes, back-to-back losing seasons in 1982 and 1983 led to Pickett's dismissal.

Bob Stull era (1984–1985)
Washington offensive coordinator Bob Stull was the next head coach for UMass, and he led the Minutemen to a 10–12 record in two seasons before leaving the program to accept the head coaching position at UTEP. Under Stull, the Minutemen struggled to a two-win campaign in 1984 but improved to seven wins in 1985.

Jim Reid era (1986–1991)

Jim Reid was promoted from defensive coordinator following Stull's departure and led the Minutemen for six seasons, compiling a 36–29–2 that included five non-losing seasons during his tenure. Reid and UMass parted ways after the 1991 season.

Mike Hodges era (1992–1997)
UMass once again promoted their defensive coordinator, this time making Mike Hodges the team's head coach. Under Hodges, the Minutemen compiled a record of 35–30. Steady decline in the team's play that culminated with a 2–9 record in 1997 resulted in Hodges' firing.

Mark Whipple era (1998–2003)
In his first stint as coach of UMass from 1998 to 2003, Mark Whipple won the NCAA Division I-AA national championship. His UMass teams rewrote the record books, setting more than 40 team records. The 1998 national championship team posted school records in points scored (524), touchdowns (73), total yards (7,074), passing yards (4,050), completions (306), and first downs (354).

Whipple left college football for a position as an assistant coach with the Pittsburgh Steelers of the NFL in 2004.

Don Brown era (2004–2008)
In 2004, Northeastern head coach Don Brown returned to UMass, where he'd served as defensive coordinator from 1998–1999 to take over as head coach. During his tenure as head coach from 2004 to 2008, UMass posted the best five-year record in school history, 43–19. In his first year, he led the Minutemen to a 6–5 record, including victories over fourth-ranked Colgate, seventh-ranked , and ninth-ranked . During 2005, Brown helped UMass to a 7–2 start and a final ranking of No. 19. That year, the Minutemen defeated fourth-ranked James Madison and handed Delaware their worst home loss in two decades, 35–7.

2006
In 2006, Brown led Massachusetts to the Atlantic 10 conference championship and a finish as runners-up to the national championship. They ended the season ranked No. 2 with a 13–2 record. At home, he set a school record with a perfect 8–0 record in McGuirk Stadium. That season, Brown was named the AFCA Region I Coach of the Year, Atlantic 10 Coach of the Year, and New England Football Coach of the Year.

2007
In 2007, UMass again won its conference, now as a member of the Colonial Athletic Association. The team advanced to the semifinals and finished the season with a No. 6 final ranking.

Brown left following the 2008 season to become defensive coordinator at Maryland.

Kevin Morris era (2009–2011)

UMass promoted offensive coordinator Kevin Morris to head coach following Brown's departure. Under Morris, the Minutemen compiled a record of 16–17.

On April 20, 2011, after decades of studies and speculation, the UMass Minutemen formally announced they elevated their football program to the NCAA Football Bowl Subdivision and became a member of the Mid-American Conference beginning with the 2012 season. The announcement was made at Gillette Stadium, where the Minutemen play some of their home games. In 2011, UMass completed their last season in the Colonial Athletic Association, and were not eligible for NCAA postseason play. UMass played a full FBS and MAC schedule in 2013 and became eligible for the MAC championship and bowl participation.

Morris was fired as UMass' head coach following a 5–6 season in 2011.

Charlie Molnar era (2012–2013)
Notre Dame offensive coordinator Charley Molnar was hired as UMass' head coach in December 2011.

The NCAA made a formal announcement of UMass' admission to FBS in the summer of 2013 after the program met specified benchmarks over its two transitioning years. The primary criteria centered around average attendance, an increase in scholarships from 63 to 85, and specific scheduling requirements. The NCAA did announce that the team must meet attendance requirements or face a 10-year probationary period. Along with joining the Mid-American Conference the men's and women's basketball teams will play four non conference games against MAC teams.

UMass struggled mightily under Molnar's tutelage, compiling back-to-back 1–11 campaigns in 2012 and 2013, the first two seasons UMass was a member of the MAC and FBS. Molnar was fired after two seasons as head coach.

Whipple's return (2014–2018)
Mark Whipple was selected as Molnar's replacement, returning to UMass after eleven years and stints in the NFL and college football as an assistant coach.
In March 2014, the MAC and UMass announced an agreement for the Minutemen to leave the conference after the 2015 season due to UMass declining an offer to become a full member of the conference. In the agreement between the MAC and the university, there was a contractual clause that had UMass playing in the MAC as a football-only member for two more seasons if UMass declined a full membership offer. UMass announced that it would look for a "more suitable conference" for the team. Possibilities included becoming independent or joining the American Athletic Conference, Conference USA, or the Sun Belt Conference.

In September 2014, UMass announced that they would become independent beginning with the 2016 season.

In 2014 and 2015, the Minutemen finished with a 3–9 record.

2016
UMass finished 2–10 in 2016. The Minutemen kicked off the season on September 3 with a 24-7 loss to No. 25 Florida. After a 26-7 loss to archrival Boston College, Whipple's team picked up its first win of the season by defeating FIU by a margin of 21-13. The next week, they lost to Mississippi State by a score of 47-35. On October 1, UMass lost to Tulane by a margin of 31-24. That was followed by a 36-16 defeat at the hands of Old Dominion. Next, Whipple's Minutemen were doubled up by Louisiana Tech in a 56-28 loss. After a 34-28 loss to South Carolina, Whipple's Minutemen defeated FCS opponent Wagner by a score of 34-10. On November 5, UMass lost to Troy by a margin of 52-31. That was followed by a 51-9 blowout at the hands of BYU. In the season finale, the Minutemen lost to Hawaii by a score of 46-40.

2017
The Minutemen finished 4–8 in 2017. They began the season on August 26 with a 38-35 loss to Hawaii. In the season's second game, UMass lost to Coastal Carolina by a score of 38-28. A third straight loss followed in the form of a 17-7 defeat at the hands of Old Dominion on September 9. Next, Whipple's team lost to Temple by a margin of 29-21. On September 23, the Minutemen played a hard-fought game but ultimately fell short against Tennessee by a score of 17-13. After a 58-50 loss to Ohio, UMass finally broke through with their first victory of the season, defeating Georgia Southern by a margin of 55-20. They recorded a second straight win the following week with a 30-27 double overtime victory over Appalachian State. After a 34-23 loss to No. 21 Mississippi State, Whipple's Minutemen defeated FCS opponent Maine by a margin of 44-31. They picked up their fourth win of the season a week later by virtue of a 16-10 victory over BYU. UMass concluded the season with a 63-45 loss to FIU on December 2.

Coach Whipple stepped down on November 20, 2018.

Walt Bell era (2019–2021)
On December 3, 2018, Florida State offensive coordinator Walt Bell was hired as UMass' newest head coach. 
UMass would finish their 2019 season 1-11, opening 0-4. They would secure their first and only win vs Akron 37-29 on September 8, then drop the next 7 games.
On August 11, 2020, UMass announced the cancellation of the 2020 season. Athletic Director Ryan Bamford explained, "The continuing challenges surrounding the COVID-19 pandemic posed too great of a risk." On September 21, UMass announced its intention to play a limited number of fall football games. UMass finished their fall campaign 0-4. They returned to a 12 game format in 2021.
The Minutemen opened their 2021 season with a 51-7 loss at Pitt, starting a 5 game losing streak. They picked up a 27-13 win against UConn, however, to snap the streak. Bell was fired on November 7, 2021, following a 35-22 loss against FCS ranked University of Rhode Island at Homecoming on November 6, 2021, bringing his 2021 season record to 1-8. Offensive coordinator Alex Miller was named his interim replacement. UMass would drop their final 3 games of the season, finishing 1-11.

Don Brown's return (2021–present)
On November 22, 2021, Don Brown, then serving as Arizona defensive coordinator, was officially rehired as the next coach of the UMass Minutemen. Brown would lead the Minutemen to a 1-11 season, beating FCS team Stony Brook 20-3 on September 17th and dropping their final game 7-44 to Army on November 26th.

Conference affiliations

 Independent (1879–1896)
 Athletic League of New England State Colleges (1897–1922) 
 Independent (1923–1946)
 Yankee Conference (1947–1996)
 Atlantic 10 Conference (1997–2006)
 Colonial Athletic Association (2007–2011)
 Mid-American Conference (2012–2015)
 Independent (2016–present)

Championships

National championships

Conference championships
UMass has won a total of 22 conference championships, 12 shared and 10 outright.

† Co-champions

Postseason appearances

Division II playoffs

Division I-AA playoffs

Bowl games
In their time in the NCAA College Division, UMass played in three bowl games, where they went 1–2. Since joining Division I FBS, the Minutemen are one of only three programs in the classification to have not competed in a bowl game.

Head coaches

Rivalries

Boston College

Massachusetts and Boston College are in-state rivals. The first game played between the two schools took place in 1899 and was played at a neutral location. Boston College won 18–0. At the time, UMass was known as Massachusetts Agricultural College. The relative proximity between the schools encouraged them to schedule additional matches in the subsequent years.

BC and UMass met again in Amherst in 1901, 1902, and 1912, with UMass winning all three contests before the series was halted. The two universities did not meet again on the football field until 1966, when they began a seventeen-year series in which the teams would play each other in the last week of UMass' football season. UMass was in a lower division than BC during the entirety of the rivalry. As such, Boston College dominated the stretch, winning fifteen of the seventeen games, routinely blowing out the overmatched Minutemen.

After 22 years, the rivalry was renewed as UMass traveled to Chestnut Hill to play Boston College once again. UMass was yet again outmatched, losing 29–7. The universities agreed to play two more times over the next seven years, and Boston College won both games easily.

In April 2011, UMass announced plans to join the Mid-American Conference and move up to the NCAA Football Bowl Subdivision, the highest level of college football in the country. Boston College had been a member of this division for decades, and there was much speculation that the two schools may cultivate a renewal of the rivalry. This was confirmed when it was reported in September 2011, that they had agreed to play a three-game biannual series beginning in 2014. Two of the games will be played at BC's Alumni Stadium and the other will be held at Gillette Stadium.

Most recently, the two teams met in September 2021, with BC winning 45-28.

Connecticut

The first game played between Massachusetts and UConn took place on November 6, 1897, in Amherst. UMass won 36–0. At the time, UMass was known as Massachusetts Agricultural College and Connecticut was officially Storrs Agricultural College. They had formed a loose association with other public colleges in New England such as present day New Hampshire and Rhode Island for the purpose of scheduling football matchups between the schools.

The colleges continued to schedule matches intermittently until after World War I, when they began to play on an almost-yearly basis through the mid-1920s. The series was discontinued until 1932, when the schools again met each year until World War II saw both universities disband their football teams. The schools would not match up again on the gridiron until UConn joined Massachusetts in the Yankee Conference in 1952. UConn and UMass played every season from that point on until UConn began their transition to what was then Division I-A in 2000.

UMass leads the all-time series 36–34–2. Massachusetts dominated the rivalry early, winning the first eight and 13 of the first 15 meetings between the two universities. Connecticut went on a streak of their own after that, winning 14 of the next 16 games. The 1960s again belonged to the then-Redmen of Massachusetts, as they lost only two games that decade. In the remaining years of the rivalry, the series was much more even, with neither team able to put together a winning streak of more than four games.

In April 2011, UMass announced plans to join the Mid-American Conference and move up to the NCAA Football Bowl Subdivision, the highest level of college football in the country. Prior to this decision, the two schools had scheduled a game for August 30, 2012. UMass later became a FBS Independent school starting in 2016.

Facilities

Alumni Field

The first field that the Minutemen played at was called Alumni Field, and was situated on the south end of campus. This field was replaced in 1915 by a new venue, also called Alumni Field. It was replaced in 1965 by Alumni Stadium, and later became the location of the Whitmore Administration Building.

McGuirk Alumni Stadium

The Minutemen played their last home football game for three years at McGuirk Alumni Stadium, a 17,000 seat stadium on the UMass Amherst campus in 2011. The stadium itself sits just over the town line in neighboring Hadley. The inaugural game took place on September 25, 1965, when UMass defeated the AIC Yellow Jackets, 41–0. Since the opening, UMass has enjoyed a decided home-field advantage, posting a 182–79–2 record when playing at McGuirk. The attendance record at McGuirk was set during a UMass football game against Boston College on November 25, 1972; 20,000 fans were in attendance. McGuirk was partially renovated for a return of UMass football. The expansion included a new performance center with new locker rooms and training facilities, and a new press box. In the 2012 and 2013 seasons UMass played all their home games at Gillette Stadium, but they returned to McGuirk beginning with three games in 2014. Since 2019, the Minutemen have played all of their home games at McGuirk Stadium.

Gillette Stadium

UMass first played at Gillette Stadium in the "Colonial Clash" against the University of New Hampshire on October 23, 2010. This game was renewed for the 2011 season as UMass played New Hampshire there again. For 2012–2013 the team played all of their home games at Gillette. UMass later split their home games between Gillette Stadium and the on-campus McGuirk Alumni Stadium. The last home game UMass played at Gillette Stadium was in 2018.

Notable alumni

NFL All-Pros and Pro Bowlers

Current NFL players

Individual awards
UMass has had more than 70 players named to various All-American teams since Lou Bush garnered the first selection for the Minutemen (then called the Aggies) in the early 1930s.

Conference honors
The following is a list of all Minutemen who were named Player, Coach, or Rookie of the Year for their respective conference.

College Football Hall of Fame
The following is a list of all Minutemen inducted in the College Football Hall of Fame.

Future opponents 
Announced schedules as of October 31, 2022.

 At Neutral site TBD

References

External links

 

 
1879 establishments in Massachusetts
American football teams established in 1879